The year 1503 in science and technology included many events, some of which are listed below.

Astronomy
 July 23 – Unknown at this time, Pluto moves outside Neptune's orbit, remaining there for 233 years.

Exploration
 May 10 – Christopher Columbus first sights the Cayman Islands, which he names Las Tortugas after the numerous sea turtles there.

Technology
 April 21 – Battle of Cerignola: Spanish forces defeat the French, considered the first battle in history won by gunpowder small arms.
 Giuliano da Sangallo constructs the city waIls of Arezzo in Tuscany using the new technology of bastions.

Births
 December 14 – Nostradamus, French physician and astrologer (died 1566)

References

 
16th century in science
1500s in science